Goca (Serbian Cyrillic: Гоца) is a nickname, often a diminutive form (hypocorism) of Gorana or Gordana. The nickname may refer to:

 Goca Božinovska, a Serbian pop-folk singer
 Goca Tržan, a Serbian pop singer

See also

References 

Lists of people by nickname
Hypocorisms